The Best of Sugar Ray is a 2005 Sugar Ray greatest hits album, released by Warner Bros. Records, consisting of 12 previous hits and 3 new recordings. Tracks 1, 9, and 14 are new tracks. Tracks 7 and 10 are from Lemonade and Brownies, Tracks 3 and 12 are from Floored, Tracks 4, 6 and 8 are from 14:59, Tracks 2, 5, and 11 are from Sugar Ray, and Tracks 13 and 15 are from In the Pursuit of Leisure. The 3 new songs are: "Shot of Laughter", a cover of Cyndi Lauper's "Time After Time", and a song written by a teenage Howard Stern, "Psychedelic Bee". "Mr. Bartender" is the only hit single absent from the album.

The international edition of the album substitutes a cover of Joe Walsh's "Life's Been Good" for "Time after Time".

Track listing 
 "Shot of Laughter" – 3:42
 "Answer the Phone" – 3:58
 "Fly" (Featuring Super Cat) – 4:53
 "Someday" – 4:04
 "Under the Sun" – 3:22
 "Every Morning" – 3:41
 "Mean Machine" – 2:42
 "Falls Apart" – 4:16
 "Time After Time" – 3:56
 "Rhyme Stealer" – 2:53
 "When It's Over" – 3:39
 "RPM" – 3:22
 "Is She Really Going out with Him?" – 3:50
 "Psychedelic Bee" – 1:54 (written by Howard Stern)
 "Chasin' You Around" – 3:38

References 

2005 greatest hits albums
Sugar Ray albums
Albums produced by David Kahne
Atlantic Records compilation albums